"Isn't It Time" is a song from the American rock group, The Beach Boys. The song is the second single released from the band's twenty-ninth studio album, That's Why God Made the Radio.

A special single version was released as an EP with live versions of "California Girls", "Do It Again", "Sail On, Sailor" from Chicago on September 28, 2012 on iTunes, and was also included on The Beach Boys 2012 compilation album Fifty Big Ones. It is significantly remixed and partially re-recorded. According to Mike Love, "We actually did a little bit of extra work on the bridge to make it more of a four-part (harmony) thing and changed the lyric a little bit as well."

Personnel
The Beach Boys
Brian Wilson – vocals
Mike Love – vocals
Al Jardine – vocals
Bruce Johnston – vocals
David Marks – guitar

Additional musicians
Jeff Foskett – vocals, guitar
Jim Peterik – ukulele, percussion
Larry Millas – bass

References

The Beach Boys songs
2012 singles
2012 songs
Capitol Records singles
Song recordings produced by Brian Wilson
Songs written by Brian Wilson
Songs written by Jim Peterik
Songs written by Mike Love